Hédi Kaddour (born July 1st, 1945 in Tunis) is a French poet and novelist.

Biography 
Hédi Kaddour was born of a Tunisian father and a French mother. Received 1st at the aggregation of modern letters, he is a translator of English, German and Arabic.
He is now a professor of French literature at the New York University in France. He also teaches the writing of reports at the École des métiers de l'information (EMI, Paris) and runs one of the writing workshops of the "NRF" at Éditions Gallimard.

Editor-in-Chief of the magazine  Po&Sie , he sometimes gives literary columns to Le Monde des livres, Libération and Le Magazine Littéraire.

After several collections of poems published by Editions Gallimard, he published  in 2005, a novel that plunges into the history of men and letters of the twentieth century. This book, which mixes adventure and espionage, also houses a sentimental plot tinged with melancholy. Hailed by critics, it received the prix Goncourt du premier roman and the prix du premier roman, and was ranked "Best French novel of the year 2005" by magazine Lire.

A collection of studies on this novel appeared under the title Études sur Waltenberg, roman de Hédi Kaddour, at editions Act Mem (series "Lire Aujourd'hui") in 2007. The novel Waltenberg was translated into English by David Coward at Random House in 2007 and in German by Grete Osterwald in 2009 by Eichborn Verlag, Frankfurt am Main.

In January 2010, Hédi Kaddour published two new books: Savoir-vivre, novel, Gallimard, series "Blanche" and "Folio". A German translation appeared by Eichborn Verlag in April 2011. Les Pierres qui montent, notes et croquis de l'année 2008, Gallimard, series "Blanche".

In 2015, Hédi Kaddour received the Prix Jean-Freustié for his novel , as well as the Grand Prix du roman de l'Académie française. He was also among the four finalists of the Prix Goncourt which was eventually awarded to Leïla Slimani. In March 2016, he also received the Prix Valery Larbaud for that novel.

Three of his poems were put into music in 1999 for voice and piano by composer Karol Beffa in the series Six Mélodies  (Le Vin nouveau, Théâtre du vide and La Jalousie); These pieces were subsequently transcribed for violin (or viola) and piano in 2008 (Cinq Pièces).

Works

Novels 
2005:  in German: Waltenberg, translated by Grete Osterwald, Verlag Eichborn, Frankfurt am Main 2009 , Prix Goncourt du premier roman
2010: 
2015: Les Prépondérants,  Éditions Gallimard, series "Blanche", 464 p.  - Prix Jean-Freustié 2015 - Grand prix du roman de l'Académie française 2015. Prix Littéraire Valery Larbaud 2016.
2021: La Nuit des orateurs, Éditions Gallimard

Poetry 
1987: 
1989: 
1992: 
1994: 
1997: 
1994: 
2000:

Diary 
2010:

Other 
2007: 
2009:

Articles online 
 "Un théâtre mauvais genre.  En attendant Godot et Fin de partie" in Les Temps modernes, n°604, June 1999, p. 119-130

In collaboration 
2006: 
2007:

Bibliography 
2007:  Articles by: Frédérique Aït-Touati – Didier Alexandre – Yves Balmer – Christian Biet – Anne-Lise Blanc – Claude Burgelin – Pierre Campion – Gabrielle Chamarat – Florence Chapiro – Pierre Daubigny – Robert Davreu – Jean-Yves Debreuille – Jean-Pierre Dupouy – Bernard Franco – Christian Garcin – Gérald Garutti – Brigitte Gauthier – Gérard Gengembre – Jean Goldzink – Francine Mazière – Claude Mouchard – Nathalie Piégay – Jean-Loup Rivière – Marianne Rubinstein – Martin Rueff – Tiphaine Samoyault - Guillaume Soulez – Muriel Stuckel – Lionel Verdier
Roman Monde: Hédi Kaddour's Waltenberg. Bérengère Vachonfrance-Levet. Paradoxa vol.24: Espionage Fiction:The Seduction of Clandestinity. Pages 187-198. Collectif sous la direction de Robert L. Snyder. 2012.Vashon Island, WA 98070, États-Unis.

Prizes 
2005: Waltenberg, novel, Prix Goncourt du premier roman
2015: Les prépondérants, roman, Grand Prix du roman de l'Académie française, Prix Jean-Freustié, Prix Littéraire Valery Larbaud.

References

External links 
 Article de Bernard Pivot dans le Journal du dimanche, 16 janvier 2010, sur Savoir-vivre et Les Pierres qui montent
 Article de Pierre Campion sur Savoir-vivre et Les Pierres qui montent
 Waltenberg, dans le magazine Lire
 Article de Pierre Campion sur Waltenberg
 Waltenberg, sur Renouveau du roman

1945 births
People from Tunis
20th-century French poets
21st-century French poets
21st-century French male writers
20th-century French novelists
21st-century French novelists
Prix Goncourt du Premier Roman recipients
Grand Prix du roman de l'Académie française winners
Prix Valery Larbaud winners
Prix Jean Freustié winners
Living people
20th-century French male writers
French translators
Arabic–French translators
English–French translators
German–French translators